In mathematics, an operation is a function which takes zero or more input values (also called "operands" or "arguments") to a well-defined output value. The number of operands is the arity of the operation.

The most commonly studied operations are binary operations (i.e., operations of arity 2), such as addition and multiplication, and unary operations (i.e., operations of arity 1), such as additive inverse and multiplicative inverse. An operation of arity zero, or nullary operation, is a constant. The mixed product is an example of an operation of arity 3, also called ternary operation.

Generally, the arity is taken to be finite. However, infinitary operations are sometimes considered, in which case the "usual" operations of finite arity are called finitary operations.

A partial operation is defined similarly to an operation, but with a partial function in place of a function.

Types of operation

There are two common types of operations: unary and binary. Unary operations involve only one value, such as negation and trigonometric functions. Binary operations, on the other hand, take two values, and include addition, subtraction, multiplication, division, and exponentiation.

Operations can involve mathematical objects other than numbers. The logical values true and false can be combined using logic operations, such as and, or, and not. Vectors can be added and subtracted. Rotations can be combined using the function composition operation, performing the first rotation and then the second. Operations on sets include the binary operations union and intersection and the unary operation of complementation. Operations on functions include composition and convolution.

Operations may not be defined for every possible value of its domain. For example, in the real numbers one cannot divide by zero or take square roots of negative numbers. The values for which an operation is defined form a set called its domain of definition or active domain. The set which contains the values produced is called the codomain, but the set of actual values attained by the operation is its codomain of definition, active codomain, image or range. For example, in the real numbers, the squaring operation only produces non-negative numbers; the codomain is the set of real numbers, but the range is the non-negative numbers.

Operations can involve dissimilar objects: a vector can be multiplied by a scalar to form another vector (an operation known as scalar multiplication), and the inner product operation on two vectors produces a quantity that is scalar. An operation may or may not have certain properties, for example it may be associative, commutative, anticommutative, idempotent, and so on.

The values combined are called operands, arguments, or inputs, and the value produced is called the value, result, or output. Operations can have fewer or more than two inputs (including the case of zero input and infinitely many inputs).

An operator is similar to an operation in that it refers to the symbol or the process used to denote the operation, hence their point of view is different. For instance, one often speaks of "the operation of addition" or "the addition operation", when focusing on the operands and result, but one switches to "addition operator" (rarely "operator of addition"), when focusing on the process, or from the more symbolic viewpoint, the function .

Definition
The set  is called the domain of the operation, the set Y is called the codomain of the operation, and the fixed non-negative integer n (the number of operands) is called the arity of the operation. Thus a unary operation has arity one, and a binary operation has arity two. An operation of arity zero, called a nullary operation, is simply an element of the codomain Y. An n-ary operation can also be viewed as an -ary relation that is total on its n input domains and unique on its output domain.

An n-ary partial operation can also be viewed as an -ary relation that is unique on its output domain.

The above describes what is usually called a finitary operation, referring to the finite number of operands (the value n). There are obvious extensions where the arity is taken to be an infinite ordinal or cardinal, or even an arbitrary set indexing the operands.

Often, the use of the term operation implies that the domain of the function includes a power of the codomain (i.e. the Cartesian product of one or more copies of the codomain), although this is by no means universal, as in the case of dot product, where vectors are multiplied and result in a scalar. An example of an external operation is scalar multiplication, where a vector is multiplied by a scalar and result in a vector.

An n-ary multifunction or  ω is a mapping from a Cartesian power of a set into the set of subsets of that set, formally .

See also
 Finitary relation
 Hyperoperation
 Infix notation
 Operator
 Order of operations

References

Elementary mathematics